Gardens Point is a peninsula in central Brisbane, Queensland, Australia. It is located south of Alice Street and bounded by the Brisbane River on its other three sides.

The Brisbane CBD lies immediately to the north of the point. Gardens Point is occupied by:
  the City Botanic Gardens, from which its name is derived
  the Riverstage
 the Queensland Parliament House
 the Gardens Point campus of Queensland University of Technology
 the Old Government House

Mangroves grow on the southern and western banks of the point. The eastern bank along the Botanical Gardens contains a pedestrian promenade.

Gardens Point is connected to South Bank via the Goodwill Bridge, while the Captain Cook Bridge runs along the western bank of the point connecting the City and Kangaroo Point.

Gallery

References

Geography of Brisbane
Brisbane central business district
Brisbane localities